State Route 194 (SR 194) is a short  state highway in the west-central part of the U.S. state of Georgia. It runs west-to-east entirely within Meriwether County.

Route description
The route begins at an intersection with SR 18 in the community of Durand. It curves to the southeast until it meets its eastern terminus, an intersection with US 27 Alternate/SR 41 west of Warm Springs.

Major intersections

See also

References

External links

 Georgia Roads (Routes 181 - 200)

194
Transportation in Meriwether County, Georgia